Kader Bahini (Force of Kader) was an independent militia created during the Bangladesh Liberation War of 1971, the other being Mukti Bahini. It was named after its leader, Kader Siddique.

The militia operated against the Pakistan Army in Tangail zone. It comprised an estimated 50,000 civilians. Siddique was wounded at the Makrar battle near Balla village. Kader Bahini is notable for the capture of a Pakistani ship with large quantities of arms and ammunition at Bhuapur. They also captured several armored cars along with bulletproof carriers.

Background
A planned military pacification carried out by the Pakistan Army – codenamed Operation Searchlight – started on 25 March to curb the Bengali nationalist movement by taking control of the major cities on 26 March, and then eliminating all opposition, political or military, within one month. Before the beginning of the operation, all foreign journalists were systematically deported from East Pakistan.

During the war there were widespread killings and other atrocities – including the displacement of civilians in Bangladesh (East Pakistan at the time) and widespread violations of human rights began with the start of Operation Searchlight on 25 March 1971. Members of the Pakistani military and supporting militias killed an estimated 300,000 to 3,000,000 people, and raped 200,000–400,000 Bangladeshi women in a systematic campaign of genocidal rape.

Formation
On 1 March 1971 the Tangail district unit of Swadhin Bangla Gono Mukti Parishad was formed. They organised the local youths and provided them with military training. After the launch of operation searchlight, local Mukti Bahinis in Tangail set up blockades on the road to Tangail at Goran-Satiachara in Mirzapur. The Pakistan army entered Tangail on 3 April, breaking through the blockade. Abdul Kader Siddique who was then a leader of Chhatra League form the Kader Bahini composed Mukti Bahini from Tangail soon after. Naik Habibur Rahman Mia, a veteran (since 1955) of the 2nd East Bengal Regiment and who had been a Weapons Instructor at EBRC, was one of the Company Commanders of the Kaderia Bahini. The in-charge of training was 41 year old Ghatail, Tangail native, retired Subedar Major of the 1st East Bengal Regiment, Khondokar Abu Taher, who was one of the first generation recruits of the 1st East Bengal Regiment in 1949, retired in 1970 as Sub. Maj and had been a Weapons Instructor at PMA Kakul. Lance Naik Mohiuddin and Sepoy Abdul Majid of East Bengal Regiment were Commando Platoon Leaders. At its height the force had at its disposal more than 15,000 .303 and Chinese Rifles, 2,000 SLRs, 800 LMGs and MMGs, 200 Antitank Rocket Launchers, 80 odd 50 Cal Heavy Machine Guns, 150 60mm mortars, 40 81mm mortars, 12 105 mm Recoilless Guns, and 10 120 mm mortars.

Area of operations
The kader Bahini operated inside Tangail area. Throughout the Bangladesh Liberation war the force stayed inside Bangladeshi territory and did not move to India like many other units of the Mukti Bahini. Kader Siddiqui the founder and leader of Kader Bahini was himself a native of Tangail.

Jahazmara battle
On 10 August 1971, Kader Bahini in Tangail attacked two ships of the Pakistan army containing arms, ammunition and fuel. The two ships were named ST Razan and SU Engineers LC-3. They were attacked on the convergence point of Jamuna and Dhaleswari rivers at Sirajkandi. After a brief battle, Kader Bahini emerged as the winning side. They destroyed the supplies harming the logistics of Pakistan army in the region. The Battle came to be known as Jahazmara(Ship Killing). The Public Works Department built a monument near the site of the battle.

Liberation of Tangail
On 10 December 1971, 2,000 Indian paratroopers landed in Tangail. They joined up with Kader Bahini. Together they liberated Tangail from Pakistan army. Captain Peter, a Bengali Indian army officer had arrived on 3 December to plan the landing of the Indian troops. New Tangail town was the last stronghold of Pakistan to fall in Tangail. Tangail was freed on 11 December 1971.

Dissolution
After the surrender of Pakistan army on 16 December 1971, Sheikh Mujib was still in Pakistan. He was sentenced to death by a military tribunal. Kader Siddique declared that he and his 50 thousand men would not surrender until Mujib returned. In 1972 after Mujib had returned from Pakistan Kader and his men surrendered his arms to Mujib on Bindubasini Boys High School in Tangail town.

Former members
 Kader Siddique was the founder of Kader Bahini, which was named after him. He surrendered his weapons to Sheikh Mujib after Bangladesh Liberation war ended. He went underground after Sheikh Mujib was assassinated and carried out attacks against the Khondaker Mostaq Ahmad Government. In the late 1990s, he formed his own party Krishak Sramik Janata League. He has been its president since its founding.
 Dr. Nuran Nabi worked as a messenger bring ammunition and arms from India in 1971 for the Kader Bahini. He helped plan the landing of Indian paratroopers in Tangail on 11 December 1971.  After the war, he pursued a career in Biochemistry and became a lecturer at Dhaka University. He completed his PhD in Japan and joined Colgate toothpaste as a researcher. He wrote a book on the liberation war called "Jonmechi Ei Banglae," or "Born in Bengal".
 Abdul Latif Siddiqui is the elder brother of Kader Siddique. He is former minister in the Awami League government from 2009 to 2015. He was telecommunications and information technology minister and jute and textiles minister. As jute minister, he saw the privatization of state owned jute mills. President Hamid terminated him from his post as telecommunication minister after he made comments on the Muslim Hajj that was seen as derogatory.

See also
 Jatiya Rakkhi Bahini
 Mujib Bahini
 Human rights in Bangladesh
 Freedom of religion in Bangladesh

References

Bangladesh Liberation War
Paramilitary forces of Bangladesh
Mukti Bahini